Charles Henry Heathcote (2 April 1850–16 January 1938) was a British architect who practised in Manchester. He was articled to the church architects Charles Hansom, of Clifton, Bristol. He was awarded the RI Medal of Merit in 1868, and started his own practice in 1872.

Heathcote built city centre buildings such as Parr's Bank (1902) in York Street, the Eagle Star Building (1911) in Cross Street, Lloyds Bank (1915) in  King Street, and the earlier 107 Piccadilly textile warehouse (1899). He helped plan the Trafford Park industrial estate, working for British Westinghouse and the Ford Motor Company. He designed 15 warehouses for the Manchester Ship Canal Company. He also worked on the buildings for Richard Lane's Cheadle Royal Lunatic Asylum

Buildings
Grade 2 listed

 53 King Street, Lloyds Bank, 1915. (now Lloyds TSB).
 Northern Rock Insurance, corner Cross Street & King Street, 1895.
 Eagle Insurance, 68 Cross Street, 1911.
 Anglia House, 86 Cross Street, 1904.
 Royal London House, 202 Deansgate, 1904.
 Onward Buildings, 205–209 Deansgate, 1903–05.
 107 Piccadilly for Sparrow Hardwick & Company, 1898 (now an Abode Hotel).
 Commercial Union Buildings, 47 Spring Gardens, 1881–82.
 1–3 York Street, corner of Spring Gardens, 1902 (formerly Parrs Bank,).
 Joshua Hoyle Building, 50 Piccadilly, 1904.

Other

 Dental Hospital, Oxford Road, University of Manchester, 1908.
 7–9 Piccadilly, with W. A. Thomas, 1910.

Heathcote & Rawle Grade 2 listed

 Alliance House, 28–34 Cross Street, 1901.
 Lancashire & Yorkshire Bank, 43–45 Spring Gardens, 1890.

See also
Heathcote (surname)

References

Further reading

External links
 Charles Heathcote & Sons

1850 births
1938 deaths
20th-century English architects
Architects from Greater Manchester